

History
After the NCAA stopped holding the Division II Tournament in 1999, the five remaining Division II programs began holding the ECAC Division II Tournament rather than compete in their respective conference tournaments. From its inception the ECAC Division II tournament was the only postseason tournament held by any Division II schools. As such the winner was the de facto Division II champion. Because all of the teams that participated in the tournament were members of the Northeast-10, the tournament was renamed the Northeast-10 Tournament in 2004.

2000

Note: * denotes overtime period(s)

2001

Note: * denotes overtime period(s)

2002

Note: * denotes overtime period(s)

2003

Note: A regular season game between Saint Michael's and Stonehill was cancelled

Note: * denotes overtime period(s)

2004

Note: * denotes overtime period(s)

2005

Note: * denotes overtime period(s)

2006

Note: * denotes overtime period(s)

2007

Note: * denotes overtime period(s)

2008

Note: * denotes overtime period(s)

2009

Note: * denotes overtime period(s)

2010

Note: * denotes overtime period(s)

2011

Note: * denotes overtime period(s)

2012

Note: * denotes overtime period(s)

2013

Note: * denotes overtime period(s)

2014

Note: * denotes overtime period(s)

2015

Note: * denotes overtime period(s)

2016

Note: * denotes overtime period(s)Note: † The championship game was cancelled due to Saint Anselm team members contracting mumps. The higher-seeded Stonehill team was declared champion.

2017

Note: * denotes overtime period(s)

2018

Note: * denotes overtime period(s)

2019

Note: * denotes overtime period(s)

2020

Note: * denotes overtime period(s)

2022

Note: * denotes overtime period(s)

Championships

See also
ECAC East Men's Tournament
ECAC Northeast Tournament

References

External links

Ice hockey
Northeast-10 Conference
Recurring sporting events established in 2000